The men's welterweight event was part of the boxing programme at the 1924 Summer Olympics. The weight class was the fourth-heaviest contested, and allowed boxers of up to 147 pounds (66.7 kilograms). The competition was held from Tuesday, July 15, 1924, to Sunday, July 20, 1924. 29 boxers from 19 nations competed. Giuseppe Oldani was disqualified in his round of 16 bout against Douglas Lewis by referee T. H. Walker for persistent holding. Oldani's supporters pelted Walker with sticks, coins and walking stick knobs. This went on for nearly an hour, until Walker was escorted from the arena under the protection of several British, American and South African boxers.

Results

References

Sources
 official report
 

Welterweight